Kovo or KOVO may refer to:

 KOVO, a radio station licensed to Provo, Utah, United States
 Korea Volleyball Federation
 Isaac Kovo (1770–1854), rabbi in Ottoman Palestine
 North Vernon Airport, in Jennings County, Indiana, United States